The Codex Kingsborough, also known as the Codex Tepetlaoztoc, is a 16th-century Mesoamerican pictorial manuscript detailing the history of Tepetlaoztoc and abuse of the indigenous Tepetlaoztoc population by the Spanish encomenderos who took control after the Spanish conquest of the Aztec Empire. It is in the collections of the British Museum.

History
The manuscript was commissioned by the inhabitants of Tepetlaoztoc and its indigenous governor, Luis de Tepada after the Spanish colonization of the Americas had begun. It was part of a lawsuit brought by Tepetlaoztoc's inhabitants against the Spanish encomenderos, complaining about the mistreatment of the indigenous population, and was probably presented to the Council of the Indies. It consists of seventy-two leaves on European paper, six of which are blank.

It was made circa 1550s. At some point the codex came into the possession of the antiquarian and scholar of Mesoamerica Edward King, Viscount Kingsborough, after whom the codex is commonly known. After his death in 1837, it was bought by a bookseller named Rodd in 1843, and later bought from him by the British Museum.

References

Kingsborough, Codex
Artefacts from Africa, Oceania and the Americas in the British Museum
16th-century manuscripts
Mexico–United Kingdom relations